Menas (Minas) (died 25 August 552) considered a saint in the Calcedonian affirming church and by extension both the Eastern Orthodox Church and Roman Catholic Church of our times, was born in Alexandria, and enters the records in high ecclesiastical office as presbyter and director of the Hospital of Sampson in Constantinople, where tradition has him linked to Saint Sampson directly, and in the healing of Justinian from the bubonic plague in 542. He was appointed Patriarch of Constantinople by the Byzantine emperor Justinian I on 13 March 536. Pope Agapetus I consecrated him to succeed Anthimus, who was condemned as a monophysite.  This was the first time that a Roman Pope consecrated a Patriarch of Constantinople.

At some date very soon after his election he received the order (keleusis) from the Emperor, whose text is not preserved, but which instructed him to call a synodos endemousa to examine the case of Anthimus, which would be heard at a series of five sessions, beginning on 2 May and ending 4 June 536. This Synod condemned Anthimus, as noted in Novel XLII from Justinian, addressed directly to Menas. Within this same effort from Justinian to seal the growing rift between the Patriarch in Constantinople and that of Jerusalem, Menas later took a position against Origen, a crisis merging into the Three-Chapter Controversy, an attempt to condemn the writings of certain non-Chalcedonian figures. Because of these moves, he was excommunicated by Agapetus in 547 and in 551 for taking positions counter to those held by the Pope; but in both cases the sentence of excommunication was quickly lifted. Menas' patriarchate represents the greatest extent of papal influence in Constantinople.  Almost immediately after the events of 536, which may be viewed as a Chalcedonian victory over monophysites, the ordination of an independent network of alleged monophysite / self-professed miaphysite bishops claiming apostolic authority would begin, leading eventually to the formation of a separate non-Chalcedonian church, the still-existing Syrian Orthodox Church that would be in communion with other excommunicated sees of the same theological persuasion. Justinian and Menas' efforts for doctrinal Church unity would meet with failure.

It was during his patriarchate that emperor Justinian's church of Hagia Sophia, then the largest building in the world and the seat of the Patriarchs, was consecrated. Also, in 551 the Emperor compelled Menas to call what would be the Fifth Ecumenical Council, to reconcile the Western and Eastern Churches around the Three-Chapter Controversy, to be chaired ultimately by his successor Patriarch Eutychius of Constantinople in 553.

He died peacefully in 552. His feast day in both the Eastern Orthodox and Roman Catholic traditions is observed on August 25.

References

External links
 
 

Saints from Constantinople
Menas
Year of birth missing
6th-century Christian saints
Justinian I
Ancient Alexandrians
552 deaths